Mic Crenshaw (born 1970) is an American recording artist, political activist, and educator living in Portland in the U.S. state of Oregon. Mic Crenshaw creates music and musical platforms that connect artists across political and geographic boundaries.

Biography
Crenshaw was born on the South Side of Chicago in 1970. He graduated high school in Minneapolis, Minnesota, where he became a leading voice for social equity and racial justice. In 1992, he moved to Portland, Oregon to focus anti-racist activism into music and music education. Over the last twenty years he has recorded and produced more than ten albums. Mic Crenshaw recorded and performed with Dead Prez and Immortal Technique, and in 1994 formed the Portland-based hip hop group Hungry Mob as its frontman. In 2001, Mic Crenshaw won the Portland Poetry Slam and finished as a national finalist. He has served as co-manager of KBOO Community Radio twice since 2015.

Activism
In his teenage years, Crenshaw confronted white supremacist gangs as a founding member of Anti-Racist Action. He co-founded GlobalFam a non-profit project to create and maintain a computer center for young people in Burundi. Crenshaw uses music to critique American law enforcement as a system that perpetuates brutality against black and brown people. Crenshaw partnered with Education Without Borders (NGO), which supports education, music and art initiatives such as Books to Prisoners. He works with the Black Lives Matter movement and acts as the Political Director of Hip Hop Congress

In 2004, Mic Crenshaw attended the Economic Justice and Youth Empowerment conference in Rwanda. In 2013, Mic Crenshaw worked with a global group of artists to found Afrikan Hip Hop Caravan. The mission is to connect artists across Africa and the Diaspora through annual performance tours in Eastern and Southern Africa. During 2013–2015, the Caravan toured a live performance set in Cape Town South Africa, Harare Zimbabwe; Arusha Tanzania and Nairobi Kenya. In 2014, Afrikan Hip Hop Caravan produced "Afrikan Hiphop Caravan Collaborations" with Soundz Of the South.  Mic Crenshaw is the lead organizer of Afrikan Hip Hop Caravan in the United States.

In 2017 Crenshaw recorded an album, Last of a Dying Breed, with Micah Fletcher, a survivor of a 2017 Portland train attack in which two others were murdered.

While serving as an artist-in-residence at Benson Polytechnic High School, Crenshaw was awarded a $100,000 fellowship from the Fred W. Fields Fund, to help Oregonians "understand the impact of the opportunity gap on families and communities, inspiring people to help solve it."

In 2020, Crenshaw performed at several George Floyd protests in Portland, Oregon, including Juneteenth in Oregon. During Black History Month 2022, Crenshaw performed with Mt. Olivet Baptist Church Gospel Ensemble in Portland.

References

Living people
American hip hop singers
American political activists
Educators from Portland, Oregon
African Americans in Oregon
1970 births
African-American history of Oregon